Wonder Man is the name of three fictional comic book characters in the DC Comics universe. The first is a superhero and his only appearance was in Superman #163 (August 1963). The second is Hercules, who uses the name when he replaces Wonder Woman as the representative of the Olympian Gods in Wonder Woman (vol. 3) #3. The third is Dane of Elysium, who is a male version of Diana Prince that exists on Earth-11, where the genders of the superheroes are reversed.

Other versions

Ajax
Within the story, he appeared on the scene and eventually came to rival Superman, possessing the same powers as he, but not his weaknesses. His popularity surpassed Superman which left him depressed, feeling like a has-been.

It was later revealed that Wonder Man used to be Ajax, one of Superman's duplicate robots that he used for help or hiding his identity. Ajax was kidnapped by the Superman Revenge Squad while in space, who turned him into a real living being while still having his bionic super-powers. The invaders wanted to use him to remove Superman so that he would no longer be in their way for their attack. Wonder Man, not being evil, thwarted their plan with Superman when he learned of their full intentions. After the aliens' defeat, Superman offered Wonder Man (who revealed to him his secret) the chance to fight at his side, but the aliens installed a death-mechanism in him that was triggered to kill him within a week. Wonder Man died, and then laid in a grave which said that he was born a robot, but died a human.

Hercules

Hercules appears during the events of One Year Later. Now shaven and bearing an updated version of the armour worn in the Hercules Unbound series, he replaces Wonder Woman as an agent of Olympus. He is referred to as "Wonder Man" by Cheetah and Nemesis. He temporarily set up his base in the Greek Embassy.

In Wonder Woman (vol. 3) #4, Hercules is revealed to have lied about his reasons for returning to Earth and was actually partnering with Circe.

Dane of Elysium
Dane of Elysium was introduced in Countdown Presents: The Search for Ray Palmer - Superwoman/Batwoman #1 (2008) as an inhabitant of Earth-11, which is home to reverse-gendered superheroes. He is the reverse gender of New Earth's Diana Prince. It is revealed that Dane was exiled from "Woman's World" when he killed Maxine Lord on national television for controlling Superwoman. He eventually led his male Amazons into battle against the United States, and fought Superwoman and the Justice League, defeating them.

Following the Flashpoint (2011) reboot, Earth 11's gender-reversed Wonder Woman is Wonderous Man, as shown in The Multiversity Guidebook (2015).

Wonder Man from Earth-11 is separate from Wonder Warrior, who was another male version of Wonder Woman created by Mister Mxyzptlk and existed in a pre-Crisis reverse-gendered reality.

See also
 Captain Wonder
 Olympian
 Wonder Boy

References

External links
Ajax:
 Bio on Supermanica
 Ajax at DC Database Project

Dane of Elysium:
 Just Past the Horizon: Earth-11

DC Comics characters who can move at superhuman speeds
DC Comics characters with superhuman strength
DC Comics superheroes
DC Comics robots
Fictional characters with superhuman durability or invulnerability